Zavala District is a district of Inhambane Province in south-east Mozambique. Its principal town is Zavala. The district is located at the east of the province, and borders with Inharrime District in the north and with Manjacaze District of Gaza Province in the west. In the east and in the south, the district is bounded by the Indian Ocean. It has a population of 139.616 as of 2007.

Geography
The rivers in the northern part of the district belong to the drainage basin of the Inharime River. Rivers in much of the south of the district drain into Lake Poolela.

The climate is tropical arid in the interior and tropical humid at the coast.

History
Quissico was founded between 1914 and 1916 and was granted a town status during colonial times.

Demographics
As of 2005, 46% of the population of the district was younger than 15 years. 50% of the population spoke Portuguese. The most common mothertongue among the population was Chopi. 53% were analphabetic, mostly women.

Administrative divisions
The district is divided into two postos, Zavala (two localities) and Zandamela (two localities).

Economy
Less than 1% of the households in the district have access to electricity.

Agriculture
In the district, there are 30,000 farms which have on average  of land. The main agricultural products are corn, cassava, cowpea, peanut, sweet potato, and rice.

Transportation
There is a road network in the district which includes a  stretch of the national road EN1, running along the coast.

References

Districts in Inhambane Province